Ben Harvey is an Australian radio presenter and comedian. 

He co-hosts Ben, Liam & Belle on Nova 100 with Liam Stapleton and Belle Jackson.

Early life 
Harvey grew up on acreage in Lewiston, South Australia. He left school aged 16, and worked on a dairy farm. At 18 years old, Harvey moved to Adelaide.

Career 
Harvey began volunteering at the Adelaide community radio station Fresh 92.7, where he met Liam Stapleton. As a duo, "Ben & Liam" went on to present the breakfast show for Fresh 92.7, compete in the state finals of Raw Comedy, and host a comedy show at the Adelaide Fringe Festival.

In late 2016, Harvey and Stapleton were confirmed to take over from Matt Okine and Alex Dyson as co-hosts of the nationwide Triple J Breakfast show in 2017. They were signed on for another year in the role in 2018.

References 

Living people
People from South Australia
Australian male comedians
Triple J announcers
Year of birth missing (living people)